Murko is a gender-neutral Slovenian surname that may refer to

Mojca Drčar Murko (born 1942), Slovenian politician 
Peter Murko (born 1984), Slovenian football defender
Tomaž Murko (born 1979), Slovenian football goalkeeper

Slovene-language surnames